Baden Powell de Aquino (6 August 1937 – 26 September 2000), known professionally as Baden Powell, was a Brazilian guitarist.  He combined classical techniques with popular harmony and swing. He performed in many styles, including bossa nova, samba, Brazilian jazz, Latin jazz and MPB. He performed on stage during most of his lifetime. Powell composed many pieces for guitar, such as "Abração em Madrid", "Braziliense", "Canto de Ossanha", "Casa Velha", "Consolação", "Horizon", "Imagem", "Lotus", "Samba", "Samba Triste", "Simplesmente", "Tristeza e Solidão", and "Samba da Benção". He released Os Afro-sambas, a watershed album in MPB, with Vinicius de Moraes in 1966.

Biography
Baden Powell de Aquino was born in Varre-Sai in Rio de Janeiro, Brazil. His father, a Scouting enthusiast, named him after Robert Baden-Powell. When he was three months old, his family relocated to the Rio suburb of São Cristóvão. His house was a stop for popular musicians during his formative years. He started guitar lessons with Jayme Florence, a famous choro guitarist in the 1940s. He soon proved a young virtuoso, having won many talent competitions before he was a teenager. At age fifteen, he was playing professionally, accompanying singers and bands in various styles. He was fascinated by swing and jazz, but his main influences were in the Brazilian guitar canon.

In 1955, Powell played with the Steve Bernard Orquestra at the Boite Plaza, a nightclub within the Plaza Hotel in Rio, where his skill got the attention of the jazz trio playing across the lobby at the Plaza Bar. When Ed Lincoln needed to form a new trio, he asked Powell to join on guitar to become the Hotel Plaza Trio. Powell brought in Luiz Marinho on bass and a fourth member of the "trio": Claudette Soares on vocals. Powell, Lincoln, and their young musician friends took part in after-hours jam sessions, gaining notice in the growing Brazilian jazz scene.

Powell achieved wider fame in 1959 by convincing Billy Blanco, an established singer and songwriter, to put lyrics to one of Baden's compositions. The result was called "Samba Triste" and quickly became very successful. It has been covered by many artists, including Stan Getz and Charlie Byrd in their seminal LP Jazz Samba.

In 1962, Powell met the poet-diplomat Vinicius de Moraes and began a collaboration that yielded classics of 1960s Brazilian music. Although bossa nova was the prevailing sound at the time, Baden and Vinicius wanted to combine samba with Afro-Brazilian forms such as candomblé, umbanda, and capoeira. In 1966 they released Os Afro-Sambas de Baden e Vinicius.

Powell studied advanced harmony with Moacir Santos and released recordings on the Brazilian labels Elenco Records and Forma, as well as in the French label Barclay and the German label MPS/Saba (notably, his 1966 Tristeza on Guitar). He was the house guitarist for Elenco, and of the singer Elis Regina's TV show O Fino da Bossa.

In 1968, Powell joined with poet Paulo César Pinheiro and produced another series of Afro-Brazilian-inspired music, released in 1970 as Os Cantores da Lapinha.

Powell visited and toured Europe frequently in the 1960s, relocating permanently to France in 1968.

In the 1970s, he released recordings with labels in Europe and Brazil. In 1981, during four weeks, he was on the stage of Palais des glaces in Paris as guitarist and singer. However, he had health problems and spent the 1980s in semi-retirement in France and Germany. In the 1990s he and his family moved back to Brazil, where he continued to record and perform. Public recognition of his work came around that time in Brazil.

By the end of the 1990s he converted to evangelical Christianity, to which he credits overcoming his long addictions to alcohol and tobacco. He fell terminally ill in 2000 and died of general infection triggered by a bacterial pneumonia on 26 September 2000, in Rio de Janeiro.

He is the father of pianist Philippe Baden Powell de Aquino and guitarist Louis Marcel Powell de Aquino.

Playing style
Baden Powell decided at age 19 to stop playing the electric guitar, preferring to concentrate on the classical guitar for the rest of his career. He did record a series of albums with a borrowed steel-string acoustic, but that is as far as he strayed from his main instrument in his adulthood.

An analysis of his repertoire reveals a wide range of interests. It spanned all the idioms of Brazilian popular music of the 20th century: samba, bossa nova, Afro-bahian ritual music, frevo, choro, and North Eastern Sertão music, and even European and Japanese lullabies. Like most musicians growing up in the 1940s and 1950s, he was deeply influenced by jazz, especially bebop and swing. He covered Thelonious Monk's "Round Midnight" on two recordings, and Jerome Kern's "All the Things You Are" on three occasions (including his first solo album).

This upbringing is reflected in his playing style, which shows a fusion of jazz harmonies and classical guitar technique, with a very Brazilian right hand (the one carrying the rhythm on the guitar). In solo classical music, he was proficient in the works of Tárrega and Bach. When playing in a group, he was able to accompany singers with quiet mastery, or let loose and play street samba in sloppy "party" style as if the guitar was another percussion instrument. Like Monk, he was fond of the minor second interval as a way to "bend" the tonality. However, because of his jazz background, he would rarely physically bend the string, preferring instead to play the minor second using an adjacent open string. Students of his style should note this preference for chord voicings that feature extensions on the open strings as a way of punctuating passages. Other idioms to watch for are the endless variations in rhythm played by the right hand, always within the proper  samba meter, as well as his tendency to put his "signature" in a fast descending scale with a (slower) ascending arpeggio in the relative key. He also used vocalise and scat singing, often in unison with the melody line (especially when the melody was sung on the bass strings of the guitar).

His influences were his first teacher "Meira" (Jayme Florence, 1909–1982), Dilermando Reis (1916–1977), and Garoto (Anibal Augusto Sardinha, 1915–1955). He also commented about being influenced by the work of Les Paul (1915–2009), Django Reinhardt (1910–1953), and Jacques Loussier (1934–2019).

Discography
Baden Powell first appeared as accompanist on a few big band and samba recordings from the 1950s. He recorded his first solo album in 1959, but it was released in 1961. His first and second albums contain jazz standards, Brazilian popular music of the time, and original compositions. In 1962, he recorded with flautist Herbie Mann and drummer Jimmy Pratt. In 1963 he led small ensembles in Brazil and France. The French labels Barclay and Festival released many of his recordings. In Germany, MPS/Saba released his work with producer Joachim Berendt. In Brazil, he recorded for Elenco Records, Forma, and the Brazilian subsidiary of Philips Records. After a few new releases in the 1980s, Powell returned to recording studios in Brazil for his final years. His later recordings consist of solo guitar or voice and guitar.

Albums

With Herbie Mann
Do the Bossa Nova with Herbie Mann (Atlantic, 1962)
Latin Fever (Atlantic, 1964)
With Miltinho com o Sexteto Sideral
Um Novo Astro (Sideral, 1960)

References

Bibliography
 De Stefano, Gildo, Il popolo del samba, La vicenda e i protagonisti della storia della musica popolare brasiliana, Preface by Chico Buarque de Hollanda, Introduction by Gianni Minà, RAI-ERI, Rome 2005, 
 De Stefano, Gildo, Saudade Bossa Nova: musiche, contaminazioni e ritmi del Brasile, Preface by Chico Buarque, Introduction by Gianni Minà, Logisma Editore, Firenze 2017,

External links
Baden Powell

1937 births
2000 deaths
20th-century classical composers
Bossa nova guitarists
Brazilian composers
Brazilian jazz guitarists
Brazilian male guitarists
Brazilian Presbyterians
Composers for the classical guitar
Converts to evangelical Christianity
Latin jazz guitarists
Música Popular Brasileira guitarists
20th-century guitarists
20th-century male musicians
Male jazz musicians
Sunnyside Records artists
MPS Records artists
Deaths from pneumonia in Rio de Janeiro (state)